Locksley is a locality in the central tablelands region of New South Wales Australia, previously called Dirty Swamp.  It is located on the Main Western railway line.  A now-closed railway station opened in 1872.

History

The Dirty Swamp railway station was located nineteen miles beyond Rydal and was opened for passenger traffic on 22 April 1872.  At that stage it was the end of the line, but it was expected the line would be extended through to Kelso “in the course of a few months”.  The Rydal to Dirty Swamp line was constructed under contract by Messrs. Blunt and Williams.

The name of the Dirty Swamp Post Office was changed to Locksley Post Office from 15 February 1880.

References

Localities in New South Wales
Main Western railway line, New South Wales
Central Tablelands